Henry Davis (November 1873 – 1938) was an English footballer who played in the Football League for The Wednesday. He played in the 1896 FA Cup Final victory against Wolverhampton Wanderers.

References

1872 births
1949 deaths
English footballers
Association football forwards
English Football League players
Football Alliance players
Birmingham St George's F.C. players
Sheffield Wednesday F.C. players
FA Cup Final players